This is a list of people pardoned by George W. Bush.  Bush, a Republican, served as the 43rd president of the United States from 2001 to 2009.

Constitutional authority 

The pardon powers of the president are outlined in Article Two of the United States Constitution (Section 2, Clause 1), which provides:

Definitions 

 A pardon is an executive order granting clemency for a conviction, it may be granted "at any point after the...commission" of the crime. As per Justice Department regulations, convicted persons may only apply five or more years after their sentence has been completed. However, the president's power to pardon is not restricted by any temporal constraints except that the crime must have been committed. Its practical effect is the restoration of civil rights and statutory disabilities (i.e., firearm rights, occupational licensing) associated with a past criminal conviction. In rarer cases, such as the pardon of Richard Nixon, a pardon can also halt criminal proceedings and prevent an indictment.
 A commutation is the mitigation of the sentence of someone currently serving a sentence for a crime pursuant to a conviction, without vacating the conviction itself.

List of people pardoned or granted clemency by the president of the United States 

A list of people pardoned or granted clemency by the president of the United States, ordered by date of pardon or commutation, is available here: List of people pardoned or granted clemency by the president of the United States.

Pardons issued by George W. Bush

December 20, 2002

November 5, 2003

February 14, 2004

May 20, 2004

July 6, 2004

November 17, 2004

December 21, 2004

March 3, 2005

June 8, 2005

September 28, 2005

December 20, 2005

April 18, 2006

August 16, 2006

Department of Justice Immediate Release

December 21, 2006

December 10, 2007

March 24, 2008

November 24, 2008

January 1, 2009

Commutations issued by George W. Bush 

 Bobby Mac Berry, May 20, 2004 (Conspiracy to manufacture and possess with intent to manufacture marijuana, money laundering)
 Geraldine Gordon, May 20, 2004 (Conspiracy to distribute phencyclidine, distribution of phencyclidine)
 Phillip Anthony Emmert, December 21, 2006 (Conspiracy to distribute methamphetamine)
 Lewis Libby, July 2, 2007 in connect to the Valerie Plame affair (one count of obstruction of justice; two counts of perjury; and one count of making false statements to federal investigators)
 Michael Dwayne Short, December 10, 2007 (Aiding and abetting the distribution of cocaine base)
 Patricia Beckford, March 24, 2008 (Conspiracy and attempt to distribute in excess of 50 grams of crack cocaine)
 John Forté, November 24, 2008 (possession with intent to distribute cocaine and conspiracy to distribute)
 James Russell Harris, November 24, 2008 (convicted in 1993 of cocaine conspiracy, money laundering and bribery)
 Reed Raymond Prior of Des Moines, Iowa, December 23, 2008 (possession of methamphetamine with intent to distribute)
 Ignacio Ramos, January 19, 2009 (2006 Shooting and wounding admitted and later convicted drug smuggler Osvaldo Aldrete Dávila and trying to cover up the incident)
 Jose Compean, January 19, 2009 (2006 Shooting and wounding admitted and later convicted drug smuggler Osvaldo Aldrete Dávila and trying to cover up the incident)

Commutation issued by George W. Bush as Governor of Texas 

 Henry Lee Lucas  serial killer convicted of 11 homicides

See also 

 Federal pardons in the United States
 List of people pardoned or granted clemency by the president of the United States
 List of people pardoned by George H. W. Bush
 List of people pardoned by Bill Clinton
 List of people granted executive clemency by Barack Obama

References

Sources 

 United States Department of Justice, Office of the Pardon Attorney Pardons Granted by President Bush
 President Grants Pardons To 11, The Washington Post, (December 24, 2005)
 Hot Springs Woman Pardoned By President Bush Associated Press, (April 19, 2006)
 Massachusetts man among eleven pardoned by Bush Eyewitness News, (April 19, 2006)
 Washington: Bush Pardons 11 New York Times, (April 19, 2006)
 President Pardons 17 Petty Criminals Associated Press, (August 17, 2006) [https://www.justice.gov/pardon/gwbush-pardons https://www.justice.gov/pardon/gwbush-pardons
 Pardon More Than the Turkey San Francisco Chronicle, (November 23, 2006)
 President Bush Gives Out 16 Pardons, 1 Commutation WCBS Newsradio 880, (December 22, 2006)
 
Special:History/List of people pardoned by george w. bush

External links 
 "Constitutional Law of Pardons: Scope and Limits of President's Power" by Samuel T. Morison.
 "Begging Bush's Pardon" by George Lardner, Jr., opinion in The New York Times, February 4, 2008
 "Begging Bush's pardon" by Margaret Colgate Love, opinion in the Los Angeles Times, June 7, 2006
 President's Statement Upon Libby Commutation
 Text of Libby Clemency Grant

Pardons
+Bush, George W.
Pardons Bush
Pardoned by Bush W
Articles containing video clips
George W. Bush-related lists